Rose Anne Kenny is an Irish geriatrician. She is the Regius Professor of Physic and a professor of medical gerontology at Trinity College Dublin (TCD), director of the Falls and Black-out Unit at St James' Hospital in Dublin, director of the Mercer's Institute for Successful Ageing and founding principal investigator for The Irish Longitudinal Study on Ageing (TILDA). She was admitted in 2014 to the Royal Irish Academy in recognition of academic excellence and achievement. Kenny is a fellow of Trinity College Dublin and of the Royal Colleges of Physicians of Ireland, London and Edinburgh.

Kenny is the Strategic Director for the Academic Health Sciences Centre, St James’s Hospital and Trinity College Dublin in 2021 and is a member of the Advisory Board,  for the Dutch Heart Brain Consortium and of the Association for Physicians, for Great Britain and Ireland since 1994. In 2020, she became President of the Irish Gerontological Society, an all-Ireland interdisciplinary organisation which facilitates research and education on ageing, translating research into improved and enhanced ageing-specific practices and policies. This research is concerned with the study of changes in older people’s physical and cognitive health, and the social changes people experience as they age. She is still active in her role as the Principal Investigator of The Irish Longitudinal Study on Ageing (TILDA) at Trinity College Dublin, which works to translate its cutting edge ageing research on Ireland’s older population into effective policy to benefit society.

Career 
Rose Anne Kenny began her career studying medicine at NUI Galway. She did her clinical training at Hammersmith Hospital and Westminster Hospital in London. In 1989, Kenny was made professor of cardiovascular medicine at the University of Newcastle and spent sixteen years there; where she was head of academic and clinical departments of Medical Gerontology for twelve years. She also held the chair of cardiovascular research at Newcastle University. In 1992, Kenny established the first dedicated syncope service in the UK, a practice which has been replicated worldwide.

In 2005, she was appointed professor of Medical Gerontology at TCD and as head of the academic department of Medical Gerontology at St James' Hospital Dublin. Kenny is the founding Principal Investigator of TILDA, Ireland's primary research study on ageing that looks at the health, lifestyles and financial situation of 8,504 people as they grow older and sees how their circumstances change. Her research in cardiovascular and mobility ageing issues has led to the incorporation of novel tests of motion range and cognitive health in TILDA. She has published over 500 pieces of work and is also the Founding Director,  of the Trinity Ageing Research Centre, (TARC), (formerly known as Trinity CollegeTrinity EngAGE), Trinity College Dublin's Centre for Research in Ageing. Kenny is co-founder and director of the Mercer's Institute for Successful Ageing where she set up a 120-bed clinical research facility, the largest purpose built clinical research facility for aging in Ireland and the UK. She has also published extensively on cardiovascular risk factors for falls and cognitive decline in ageing. Professor Rose Anne Kenny's research interests are in neurocardiovascular function in ageing and cardiovascular and cerebral dysfunction in syncope, falls, cognitive impairment and dementia.

Kenny is Advisor to the Irish Government for Jobs, Enterprise and Innovation and to the Irish Citizens' Assembly on Ageing. She is Board Member of the EU H2020 Advisory Group for Societal Challenge and Co-Chair of the working group "Transforming the Future of Ageing" led by the Scientific Advisory Policy by European Academies. Her contribution to science has been recognised by many awards including the Lady Illingworth Research Award, the BUPA Foundation Care Award and membership of the Royal Irish Academy.

In  September 2017, she was awarded the Presidential Medal, the highest honour from The Irish Gerontological Society for her achievements in the field of gerontological research at the 65th Annual & Scientific Meeting. She was also awarded the World Congress on Falls and Postural Stability (WCFPS) Lifetime Achievement Award in 2019 and Health Hero by the Irish Times in 2018. Kenny also holds achievements as the 2021 Honorary Fellow Faculty of Public Health Medicine (F.F.P.H.M.I (Hon)) and has chaired the selection committee for Provost of Trinity College Dublin, 2021.

Media Appearances 
Professor Kenny has made numerous appearances on both TV and radio platforms over the past decade, regularly appearing at least monthly in Irish media interviews in television, radio and print. Some examples include contributing towards a two-hour documentary that she wrote and delivered (2010) on ageing for Ireland’s national broadcaster (RTE) called The End of Ageing; Nationwide (2018), Ear to the Ground (2020) and  “10 Things to Know About…” (2020) where she communicated research from the TILDA study and its COVID-19 related research studies. She has also given television interviews to Al-Jazeera English, BBC and numerous radio interviews (Drivetime RTE, Newstalk and RTE Radio One), and her research has also featured in several podcasts and newspaper articles. In partnership with the GAA, she delivered a National Road Show and public outreach campaign delivering insight and research on, ‘How to Age Well’ communicating research to each county in Ireland in 2019 and early 2020. She has written a new book entitled, Age is Not a Number soon to be published by Bonnier Publications, of London and Stockholm in January 2022.

Honours and memberships 

 1990: Fellow of the Royal College of Physicians of Ireland
 1994: Fellow of the Royal College of Physicians of London
 1996: Lady Illingworth Research Award - only presented every 5 years to a clinician who has made an outstanding contribution to age-related study in the UK
 1998: The Research into Ageing Edgar Palamountain Prize - awarded for an article on medical geriatrics judged to have the most significant contribution to the field
 2000: Novartis Travel Fellowship - awarded by the Australian Association of Physicians to a guest clinician in the field of geriatric medicine
 2002: Marjorie Warren Lecture
 2003: Fellow of the European Society of Cardiology
 2003: NHS Modernisation Award - "for clinical leadership in the NHS" (runner up)
 2003: BUPA Foundation Care Award - "for excellence in the development of care of older people"
 2006: Member of the Academic Board of the European Union Geriatric Medicine Society
2006: Professor of Medical Gerontology, Trinity College Dublin
2006: Consultant Physician, St. James's Hospital, Dublin 8
2006: Director Mercers Institute for Successful Ageing, St. James's Hospital, Dublin 8
2006: Director Falls and Syncope Service, St. James's Hospital, Dublin
2006: Founding Principal Investigator, TILDA, Trinity College Dublin
2009: Founding Director, Trinity Ageing Research Centre, (TARC), Trinity College
 2010: Member of the European Heart Rhythm Association
 2013: Fellow of the Royal College of Physicians of Edinburgh
 2013: Elected Fellow of Trinity College Dublin
 2014: Admitted to the Royal Irish Academy
2018: Head of Department of Medical Gerontology, Trinity College Dublin
2020: President of the Irish Gerontological Society
2022: Regius Professor of Physic, Trinity College Dublin

References 

Irish geriatricians
Women geriatricians
Irish neuroscientists
Irish cardiologists
Fellows of the Royal College of Physicians of Ireland
Living people
Members of the Royal Irish Academy
Year of birth missing (living people)